Life After Def is the sixth studio album released by American singer Montell Jordan. It was released on October 21, 2003 for Koch Entertainment and The Interprise Inc, marking his first project not to be released for Def Jam Recordings. Chiefly produced by Jordan and Jor Ja Blac, it peaked at number 54 on the US Billboard Top R&B/Hip-Hop Albums and number 30 on the Independent Albums chart. The album was preceded by the single "Supa Star" which reached number 71 on the Hot R&B/Hip-Hop Singles & Tracks.

Track listing

Charts

References

Montell Jordan albums
2003 albums